Subhodeep Mukherjee (Bengali: শুভদীপ মুখারজী) is a Ghazal singer. He performs Hindustani classical and experimental Ghazal ‘Jugalbandis’. He belongs to the Kolkata.

Career

Subhodeep started performing professionally in various concerts from the year 2000. He played his international debut concert at Los Angeles, United States in 2015.

References

Living people
Indian male classical musicians
1970 births
Bengali Hindus